Kalpana Dash (7 July 1966 – 23 May 2019) was an Indian lawyer and mountaineer. She was the first Odia mountaineer to scale Mount Everest. She scaled Mount Everest on 21 May 2008, along with a team of five members from the United States, Canada and Nepal.

She had attempted to climb Mount Everest twice before, once in 2004 and once in 2006, but failed due to bad weather and health conditions.

Death
On 23 May 2019, Dash again summited Everest with two others, but became ill on the descent and died just above the balcony of Mount Everest.

The cause of her death was the unusual congestion near the summit of Mount Everest because of a narrow climbing window made narrower by severe weather conditions and the Nepal government issuing permits to several hundred climbers. At least 11 climbers — many of them veteran mountain climbers like Dash — from Nepal, Europe, United States and India died during the 2019 climbing season in April and May 2019. Donald Cash from Utah in the United States and Anjali Kulkarni from India were among those who died in the same week as Dash.

Her body was recovered by Sherpas and brought to India.

Expeditions
 Denali - North America's highest peak 2010 (unsuccessful attempt)
 Mount Kilimanjaro- Africa's highest peak - 5,895 m successfully summited on 9 October 2014
 Aconcagua - South America's highest peak - 6,962 m successfully summited on 16 January 2015
 Mount Elbrus - Europe's highest peak - 5,642 m successfully summited on 31 July 2015
 Mount Kosciuszko - Australia's highest peak 2,228 m successfully summited on 3 December 2015

See also
Indian summiters of Mount Everest - Year wise
List of Mount Everest summiters by number of times to the summit
List of Mount Everest records of India
List of Mount Everest records
List of people who died climbing Mount Everest

References

1966 births
2019 deaths
Indian female mountain climbers
Indian mountain climbers
Sportswomen from Odisha
20th-century Indian women
20th-century Indian people
Indian summiters of Mount Everest
Deceased Everest summiters
21st-century Indian women
21st-century Indian people